B. Jeevan Reddy is an Indian film director who works in predominantly Telugu-language films. He is known for his work in George Reddy (2019).

Career 
B. Jeevan Reddy worked as an assistant director for Raksha  (2008) and Ram Gopal Varma's Katha Screenplay Darsakatvam Appalaraju (2011) before making his directorial debut with Dalam (2013). The film was simultaneously shot in Tamil as Koottam and released in 2014. The film received mixed reviews upon release. His next film was George Reddy (2019), which was based on the person of the eponymous name. Reddy researched about George Reddy for one and a half years before making the film. The film released to above average reviews, with one critic from The Times of India noting that "Jeevan stays true to the incidents that rocked Andhra Pradesh's politics in the 60s and 70s. At no point, does he try to make the character seem larger-than-life, and keeps things real, making George Reddy a gripping watch".

Filmography

References

External links 

Indian film directors
Living people
Telugu film directors
Year of birth missing (living people)